Luverne is a city in Rock County, Minnesota, United States, along the Rock River. The population was 4,946 at the 2020 census. It is one of four towns profiled in the 2007 Ken Burns documentary The War. It is the main setting for the second season of the TV show Fargo.

History
A post office called Luverne has been in operation since 1868. Luverne was platted in 1870, and named for Luverne Hawes, the daughter of a settler.

Geography

Rock County holds the distinction of being one of four counties in the state of Minnesota without a natural lake.

Demographics

2010 census
As of the census of 2010, there were 4,745 people, 2,048 households, and 1,257 families residing in the city. The racial makeup of the city was 96.3% White, 0.8% African American, 0.2% Native American, 0.6% Asian, 0.4% from other races, and 1.6% from two or more races. Hispanic or Latino of any race were 2.7% of the population.

There were 2,048 households, of which 27.7% had children under the age of 18 living with them, 49.0% were married couples living together, 9.1% had a female householder with no husband present, 3.3% had a male householder with no wife present, and 38.6% were non-families. 35.8% of all households were made up of individuals, and 19% had someone living alone who was 65 years of age or older. The average household size was 2.23 and the average family size was 2.89.

The median age in the city was 42.1 years. 24.4% of residents were under the age of 18; 6.4% were between the ages of 18 and 24; 22% were from 25 to 44; 24.3% were from 45 to 64; and 23% were 65 years of age or older. The gender makeup of the city was 46.8% male and 53.2% female.

2000 census
As of the census of 2000, there were 4,617 people, 1,968 households, and 1,247 families residing in the city. The racial makeup of the city was 97.27% White, 0.67% African American, 0.32% Native American, 0.58% Asian, 0.58% from other races, and 0.56% from two or more races. Hispanic or Latino of any race were 1.56% of the population.

There were 1,968 households, out of which 26.4% had children under the age of 18 living with them, 53.8% were married couples living together, 7.3% had a female householder with no husband present, and 36.6% were non-families. 33.9% of all households were made up of individuals, and 21.2% had someone living alone who was 65 years of age or older. The average household size was 2.25 and the average family size was 2.90.

In the city, the population was spread out, with 23.8% under the age of 18, 6.9% from 18 to 24, 22.3% from 25 to 44, 20.6% from 45 to 64, and 26.4% who were 65 years of age or older. The median age was 43 years. For every 100 females, there were 89.4 males. For every 100 females age 18 and over, there were 83.5 males

The median income for a household in the city was $36,271, and the median income for a family was $46,745. Males had a median income of $30,549 versus $22,660 for females. The per capita income for the city was $18,692. About 5.7% of families and 8.8% of the population were below the poverty line, including 7.1% of those under age 18 and 10.0% of those age 65 or over.

Government
Luverne is located in Minnesota's 1st congressional district, represented by Brad Finstad, a Republican. At the state level, Luverne is located in Senate District 22, represented by Republican Bill Weber, and in House District 22A, represented by Republican Joe Schomacker.

Education
The Luverne Public Schools system provides education for grades kindergarten-12. A new elementary school addition opened on 1 December 1998. Luverne Senior High School is the system's high school.

Luverne has an active chapter of Dollars for Scholars. According to its website, Luverne Dollars for Scholars has an endowment of approximately $2.9 million.

Parks and recreation
The Blue Mound Biking and Hiking Trail is a six-mile (10 km) path that stretches from Main Street in downtown Luverne to the lower lake parking lot at Blue Mounds State Park. Along the path visitors can see open scenery and agricultural fields, tree-lined shade, and a view of the Blue Mound cliff line. A portion of the trail branches off and goes to the top of the  cliff line for a panoramic view of the community.

In addition to the large City Park beside the Rock River, Luverne maintains 10 neighborhood parks.

Touch the Sky Prairie, located northwest of Luverne, is a Northern Tallgrass Prairie National Wildlife Refuge. A 15-year management plan in progress seeks to restore hundreds of native species. Touch the Sky Prairie was included in the BBC television documentary, Life—a sequel to the award-winning Planet Earth series.

Entertainment
 The Palace Theater on Main Street underwent a $1 million renovation. Then on September 6, 2007, the theater hosted the world premiere of Ken Burns' epic 15-hour PBS documentary, The War—first aired on PBS September 23, 2007. Luverne is one of four U.S. cities that serve as anchor points for The War. The series tells the story of World War II from the perspective of "so-called ordinary Americans" who fought and lived through the global cataclysm. GOP presidential candidate and former Pennsylvania Senator Rick Santorum held a town hall meeting at the Palace Theatre January 30, 2012. The packed gathering occurred one week prior to the Minnesota precinct caucuses held to influence the selection of delegates for party nominees as part of the 2012 presidential campaign.
 Green Earth Players produces children's summer theater at the Palace Theater. 
 The Verne Drive-in Movie Theater features new films for viewing outdoors.
 Rock County Veterans Memorial, dedicated May 28, 2007, is located on the south lawn of the historic and refurbished Rock County Courthouse. Many have likened the quality of the Memorial to what would be seen in Washington, D.C. The Memorial was built by KA.H.R.—a family foundation. Supplementing the Memorial are individual paver stones that honor by name Rock County veterans of all services. The design allows future Rock County veterans to be added to the site. Many surviving World War II honorees were aboard an Honor Flight sent to the World War II Memorial in Washington, D.C. on May 1, 2010. Minnesota Governor Tim Pawlenty and the state's First Lady took a personal interest in the Rock County group by being present at the send-off and previously hosting a group of Rock County World War II veterans at the Governor's Mansion. Among the veterans on the Honor Flight was long-serving former State Representative Wendell O. Erickson. The memorial lists 10 men as killed or missing in action in the Vietnam War, however 4 of those named (Boyd Beyer, Harold Keith Binford, Arlo Hemme and Dale Ruddvy) do not appear on records of those killed or missing in the war.
 Brandenburg Gallery – Photography from Luverne native and National Geographic photographer Jim Brandenburg is located on the first two floors of the Rock County Veterans Memorial Building dedicated in July 2009 on Luverne Street at Courthouse Square. Featured subjects include wildlife, the outdoors and a focus on the vanishing prairie. Profits from the Gallery go to support the mission of the Brandenburg Prairie Foundation.
 Herreid Military Museum and the Heritage Gallery occupy two upper floors of the Rock County Veterans Memorial Building. Dedicated in 2009, the new galleries building adjoins the new Kahler Terrace providing an outdoor setting for community events. A tunnel connects the building to the Rock County Courthouse, itself beautifully renovated in 1987–88. Both structures were built from locally quarried Sioux quartzite. The Memorial Building's transformation from the former county jail and Sheriff's residence to a museum complex was driven by the KA.H.R. Foundation of Warren Herreid II and Jeannine Rivet.

Transportation

Roads
Interstate 90 and U.S. Route 75 are two of the main routes in the city. Iowa borders to the south and South Dakota to the west. The regional center of Sioux Falls, South Dakota, is a 30-minute drive on Interstate 90.

Air
Luverne is served by Quentin Aanenson Field. A lengthened runway and expanded facilities went into service in 2009. The airport is named after World War II flying ace Quentin C. Aanenson.

Notable people
 Quentin C. Aanenson – World War II flying ace, born in Luverne. Aanenson completed 75 flying missions, earning numerous medals. Aanenson participated in Ken Burns' The War series. Luverne's airfield is named after him
 Jim Brandenburg – Award-winning nature photographer for National Geographic and other publications, filmmaker and environmentalist. Twice named Magazine Photographer of the Year and in 1988 Wildlife Photographer of the Year by Great Britain's Natural History Museum and BBC Wildlife
 Jerilyn Britz – U.S. Women's Open Golf Champion in 1979. Winner of the 1980 LPGA Mary Kay Classic. Finished second-place at two other major championships. Played on LPGA tour 1974–1999. First played golf at age 17 at Luverne Country Club course.
 Charles F. Crosby, Minnesota and Wisconsin legislator, lawyer
 Walter J. Croswell, Minnesota farmer and state legislator
 Harold H. Dammermann, Minnesota businessman, farmer, state legislator
 W.E.E. Greene, a local architect, several of whose works in Luverne are listed in the National Register of Historic Places
 Jay LaDue, Minnesota state senator and farmer
 Al McIntosh – Editor and publisher of The Rock County Star Herald, president of the forerunner to the National Newspaper Association and the Minnesota Newspaper Association.
 Frederick Manfred – Author. His work includes 18 novels set in the American West and Upper Midwest, often located in the Iowa-Minnesota-South Dakota tri-state area he named "Siouxland"
 Monti Ossenfort – American football General Manager of the NFL Arizona Cardinals (2023-present)
 Shantel VanSanten – Model and actor, born in Luverne and best known for her role in the television series One Tree Hill
 James Russell Wiggins – Executive editor of The Washington Post. Ambassador to the United Nations. He began his career by publishing a Luverne newspaper and then editing the St. Paul Pioneer Press
 Dick Wildung, University of Minnesota 2x All-American. College Football Hall of Fame and Green Bay Packer Hall of Fame Member
 Peter Baustian, U.S. Air Force, Airman First Class. Blocked a punt against the Pipestone Arrows to help the Cardinals win in the 2020 Battle Axe

References

External links

 City of Luverne
 Luverne Area Chamber of Commerce
 Rock County Star Herald and Luverne Announcer weekly newspapers

Cities in Minnesota
Cities in Rock County, Minnesota
County seats in Minnesota